Saint Thomas  is one of the Virgin Islands in the Caribbean Sea, one of the three largest of the United States Virgin Islands (USVI), an unincorporated territory of the United States. Along with surrounding minor islands, it is one of three county-equivalents in the USVI. Together with Saint John, it forms one of the districts of the USVI. The territorial capital and port of Charlotte Amalie is located on the island. As of the 2020 census, the population of Saint Thomas was 42,261, about 48.5% of the total population of the United States Virgin Islands.

History

Pre-colonial history 
The island was originally settled around 1500 BC by the Ciboney people. Ciboney sites have been uncovered in Krum Bay. The island was later inhabited by the Arawaks and then the Caribs. Arawak sites have been uncovered in Magen's Bay and Botany Bay, and Carib sites have been uncovered in Magen's Bay and Salt River. 

Christopher Columbus sighted the island in 1493 on his second voyage to the New World.

Danish and German colonial period

The Dutch West India Company established a post on Saint Thomas in 1657. The first congregation was the St. Thomas Reformed Church, which was established in 1660 and was associated with the Dutch Reformed Church.

Denmark-Norway's first attempt to settle the island in 1665 failed.  However, the Danes did resettle St. Thomas in 1671, under the sponsorship of the Glueckstadt Co., later the Danish West India Company. The first slave ships arrived in 1673, and St. Thomas became a slave market. In 1685, the Danish leased part of the island to the Brandenburger Company, which was resold to the Danish in 1754, and was granted free port status in 1764.

The land was divided into plantations and sugarcane production became the primary economic activity. As a result, the economies of Saint Thomas and the neighboring islands of Saint John and Saint Croix became highly dependent on slave labor and the slave trade. In 1685, the Brandenburgisch-Africanische Compagnie took control of the slave trade on Saint Thomas, and for some time the largest slave auctions in the world were held there.

Saint Thomas's fine natural harbor became known as "Taphus" for the drinking establishments located nearby. ("Tap Hus" translates as "rum shop" or "tap house" referring to the drinking establishments.) In 1691, the primary settlement there was renamed Charlotte Amalie in honor of the wife of Denmark's King Christian V. It was later declared a free port by Frederick V. In December 1732, the first two of many Moravian Brethren missionaries came from Herrnhut Saxony in present-day Germany to minister to them. Distrusted at first by the white masters, they lived among the slaves and soon won their confidence.

The first British invasion and occupation of the island occurred in 1801. The islands were returned to Denmark in 1802, under the terms of the Treaty of Amiens.  Fire destroyed hundreds of homes in Charlotte Amalie in 1804.
The second British occupation of the island occurred from 1807 to 1815, after the Invasion of the Danish West Indies (1807), during which they built Fort Cowell on Hassel Island.

While the sugar trade had brought prosperity to the island's free citizens, by the early 19th century Saint Thomas was in decline. The continued export of sugar was threatened by hurricanes, drought, and American competition. Following the Danish Revolution of 1848, slavery was abolished and the resulting rise in labor costs further weakened the position of Saint Thomas's sugar producers.

Given its harbors and fortifications, Saint Thomas still retained a strategic importance, and thus, in the 1860s, during the American Civil War and its aftermath, the United States government considered buying the island and its neighbors from Denmark for $7.5 million. However, the proponents of the purchase failed to gain legislative support for the bid.

Freedom of the press
In 1915, David Hamilton Jackson traveled to Denmark and convinced the King of Denmark to allow freedom of the press in Saint Thomas, Saint John, and Saint Croix. He began the first newspaper in the islands, known as The Herald. Jackson was the editor of The Herald, which had its office at 1B Kongens Gade in Christiansted. The newspaper's focus was civic and labor rights for local workers, and it published criticisms of the labor situation in the islands. After beginning The Herald, Jackson organized labor unions among the islanders for better working conditions. He was also instrumental in persuading the Danish to allow the US to purchase the islands of Saint Thomas, Saint John, and Saint Croix. The islands now have an annual celebration in November to honor the legacy of David Hamilton Jackson.

United States acquisition 

In 1917, Saint Thomas was purchased (along with Saint Croix and Saint John) by the United States for $25 million in gold ($ million today), as part of a defensive strategy to maintain control over the Caribbean and the Panama Canal during the First World War. The transfer occurred on March 31, 1917, behind Fort Christian before the barracks that now house the Legislature of the U.S Virgin Islands. The baccalaureate service for the transfer was held at the St. Thomas Reformed Church as it was identified as the American church in the Danish West Indies.

At the time of the US purchase in 1917, the colony did not include Water Island, which had been sold by Denmark to the East Asiatic Company, a private shipping company, in 1905. The company eventually sold the island to the United States in 1944, during the German occupation of Denmark. The federal government then used the island for military purposes until 1950, before finally transferring it to the territorial government in 1996.

The United States granted citizenship to the residents in 1927. The U.S. Department of the Interior took over administrative duties in 1931. American forces were based on the island during the Second World War. In 1954, passage of the U.S. Virgin Islands Organic Act officially granted territorial status to the three islands, and allowed for the formation of a local senate with politics dominated by the American Republican and Democratic parties. Full home rule was achieved in 1970.

The post-war era also saw the rise of tourism on the island. With relatively cheap air travel and the American embargo on Cuba, the numbers of visitors greatly increased. Despite natural disasters such as Hurricane Hugo (1989), Hurricanes Luis and Marilyn (1995), and Hurricanes Irma and Maria (2017) the island's infrastructure continues to improve as the flow of visitors continues. Hotels have been built from the West End to the East End, and in recent years, Saint Thomas has become a busy cruise ship port and vacation venue.

Geography
The island has a number of natural bays and harbors including Magens Bay, Great Bay, Jersey Bay, Long Bay, Fortuna Bay, and Hendrik Bay. Passenger ships dock and anchor in Long Bay, near Charlotte Amalie. Ships dock at Havensight Pier. Red Hook is an unofficial "town" located on the East End subdistrict.

Climate
Saint Thomas has a tropical savanna climate (Aw according to the Köppen climate classification) with a drier season and a wetter season.

Saint Thomas receives  of precipitation annually over 163.6 precipitation days. Autumn is the wettest time of year because of tropical cyclones. November is the wettest month, receiving  of rain on average over 17.8 precipitation days, the most of any month. March is the driest month, receiving  of rainfall over 8.1 precipitation days, the least of any month.

Demographics
Saint Thomas is divided into the following subdistricts (with population as per the 2020 U.S. Census):

 Charlotte Amalie (pop. 14,477) Charlotte Amalie town (pop. 8,194) 
 East End (pop. 7,502)
 Northside (pop. 8,889)
 Southside (pop. 4,112)
 Tutu (pop. 5,129)
 Water Island (pop. 164)
 West End (pop. 1,988)

Historical ethnic communities

From 1796 a small Jewish community developed in Charlotte Amalie. It established the Beracha Veshalom Vegmiluth Hasadim, the second oldest synagogue in the United States.

During the late nineteenth and early twentieth centuries a group of French Catholic immigrants known as the  came to St. Thomas from the St. Barthélemy islands to the east, forming one community of fishermen and one of farmers.

Transportation 

The island is serviced by the Cyril E. King International Airport.

Passenger and limited car-ferry services to neighboring islands such as Water Island, Saint John, Saint Croix, and the British Virgin Islands run regularly out of the Red Hook Terminal, Charlotte Amalie, and Crown Bay Marina.

The United States Virgin Islands is the only place under United States jurisdiction where the rule of the road is to drive on the left. This was inherited from what was the then-current Danish practice at the time of the American acquisition in 1917. However, because the islands are a U.S. territory, most cars are imported from the mainland United States and therefore the steering column is located on the left side of the vehicle.

The island has many regular taxis from compact size to large vans, as well as open-air, covered trucks called "safaris" with bench seats. The latter usually operate only between high-traffic points, e.g., cruise-ship terminals at Havensight and Crown Bay and downtown Charlotte Amalie.

Education
St. Thomas-St. John School District operates public schools on Saint Thomas.

Private schools:
 Antilles School
 Virgin Islands Montessori School & Peter Gruber International Academy

Parochial schools:
 All Saints Cathedral School
 Sts. Peter & Paul Catholic School
 Calvary Christian Academy
 Church of God Academy
 Memorial Moravian School
 Seventh Day Adventist School
 Weslyan Academy Bible School

Colleges and universities:
 University of the Virgin Islands

Notable people 

 Alton Augustus Adams − first African-American band master for the United States Navy
 Pamela Balash-Webber (1953–2020), diving instructor
 Jabari Blash − baseball player, outfielder for the Tohoku Rakuten Golden Eagles
 Edward Wilmot Blyden − ambassador, an Igbo in Diaspora; credited in some history books as having laid the foundation of West African nationalism and Pan-Africanism
 Callix Crabbe − Major League Baseball player
 Midre Cummings − Major League Baseball player
 Vanessa Daou − singer-songwriter, dancer, writer, poet
 Charles Joseph Sainte-Claire Deville − French geologist
 Henri Étienne Sainte-Claire Deville − French chemist
 Jeff Faulkner − National Football League player
 Kelsey Grammer − actor, director, and producer born in Saint Thomas
 Emile Griffith − former boxer who won world championships in both the Welterweight and Middleweight divisions
 Jean Hamlin − 17th-century French buccaneer
 Elrod Hendricks − Major League Baseball player
 Abdul Hodge − National Football League player
 Daryl Homer − Olympic fencer
 Roy Innis − civil rights leader
 Julian Jackson − boxer born in Saint Thomas
 Hannah Jeter − Sports Illustrated swimsuit cover model and wife of Derek Jeter of the New York Yankees
 J. Raymond Jones − political activist
 Christine Jowers − choreographer, producer, and dance critic
 Al McBean − Major League Baseball player
 Gabriel Milan − Governor, 1684−1686
 Akeel Morris (born 1992) − baseball player in the San Francisco Giants organization
 Ralph Moses Paiewonsky − governor
 John Patrick − screenwriter and Tony Award & Pulitzer Prize-winning playwright
 Barbara A. Petersen − administrator for Saint Thomas and Water Island
 Calvin Pickering − Major League Baseball player
 Camille Pissarro − key member of the French Impressionist group of painters
 Rashawn Ross − trumpeter who tours with Dave Matthews Band
 Roy Lester Schneider − governor and physician
 Morris Simmonds − German physician, pathologist, described a syndrome of pituitary failure with emaciation (Simmonds syndrome)
 Karrine Steffans − former hip-hop music video performer, actress, author of Confessions of A Video Vixen
 Edward Teach − pirate and privateer; may have been given a letter of marque from St. Thomas after being pardoned for pirating
 Terence Todman − ambassador
 Jean Toussaint − jazz tenor and soprano saxophonist
 Denmark Vesey − leader of planned slave uprising in Charleston, South Carolina
 Peter von Scholten − governor general
 Tiphanie Yanique – writer
 David Levy Yulee − politician and the first member of the United States Senate to have been, at one time, a practicing Jew

In popular culture

Music 
"St. Thomas" is among the most recognisable instrumentals in the repertoire of American jazz tenor saxophonist Sonny Rollins based on a traditional calypso sung to him by his mother, Valborg Solomon Rollins, who was born on Saint Thomas.

Points of interest 

 Blackbeard's Castle
 Buck Island National Wildlife Refuge
 Cathedral Church of All Saints
 Coral World Ocean Park
 Fort Christian
 Magens Bay Arboretum
 Magens Bay
 Red Hook
 Saints Peter and Paul Cathedral
 St. Thomas Synagogue

Gallery

References

 
Islands of the United States Virgin Islands
Former Danish colonies